The Menai Strait (the "river Menai") is a narrow stretch of shallow tidal water about  long, which separates the island of Anglesey from the mainland of Wales.

The differential tides at the two ends of the strait cause very strong currents to flow in both directions through the strait at different times, creating dangerous conditions. One of the most dangerous areas of the strait is known as the Swellies (or Swillies – Welsh Pwll Ceris) between the two bridges. Here, rocks near the surface cause over-falls and local whirlpools, which can be of considerable danger in themselves and cause small boats to founder on the rocks. This was the site of the loss of the training ship HMS Conway in 1953. Entering the strait at the Caernarfon end is also hazardous because of the frequently shifting sand banks that make up Caernarfon bar. On the mainland side at this point is Fort Belan, an 18th-century defensive fort built in the times of the American War of Independence (1775–1783).

The strait is bridged in two places: the Menai Suspension Bridge carrying the A5, and Robert Stephenson's 1850 Britannia Tubular Bridge. Originally the Britannia carried rail traffic in two wrought-iron rectangular box spans but after a disastrous fire in 1970, which left only the limestone pillars remaining, it was rebuilt as a steel box girder bridge, and now carries both rail and road traffic (A55). Between the two bridge crossings there is a small island in the middle of the strait, Ynys Gorad Goch, on which are built a house and outbuildings and around which are the significant remains of fish traps, no longer used.

Origins

The present day channel is a result of glacial erosion of the bedrock along a line of weakness associated with the Menai Strait Fault System. During a series of Pleistocene glaciations a succession of ice-sheets moved from northeast to southwest across Anglesey and neighbouring Gwynedd scouring the underlying rock; the grain of which also runs in the same direction. The result was a series of linear bedrock hollows across the region, the deepest of which was flooded by the sea as world ocean levels rose at the end of the last ice age ( BC).

History

The name Menai comes from Welsh main-aw or main-wy, meaning "narrow water."

According to Heimskringla, the 11th century Norse-Gael ruler Echmarcach mac Ragnaill plundered in Wales with his friend, the Viking Guttorm Gunnhildsson. However they started quarreling over the plunder and fought a battle at the Menai Strait. Guttorm won the battle by praying to Saint Olaf and Echmarcach was killed.

In the 12th century, a later Viking raid and battle in the Menai Strait are recounted in the Orkneyinga Saga as playing an important role in the life of Magnus Erlendsson, Earl of Orkney – the future Saint Magnus. He had a reputation for piety and gentleness. Refusing to fight in the raid on Anglesey, he stayed on board his ship, singing psalms. This incident is recounted at length in the 1973 novel Magnus by Orcadian author George Mackay Brown, and in the 1977 opera, The Martyrdom of St Magnus by Peter Maxwell Davies. The first of the opera's nine parts is called "The Battle of Menai Strait".

From the 1890s until 1963, the pleasure steamers of the Liverpool and North Wales Steamship Company would ply their main route from Liverpool and Llandudno along the Menai Strait, and around Anglesey. After the company's voluntary liquidation in 1962, P and A Campbell took over the services for a while. Now, every year for two weeks in the summer, the MV Balmoral undertakes a similar service. The most recent service appears to have been Feb-2021, since when the vessel has been taken to dry dock for essential repair work

Tidal effects
The tidal effects observed along the banks of the strait can be confusing. A rising tide approaches from the south-west, causing the water in the strait to flow north-eastwards as the level rises. The tide also flows around Anglesey until, after a few hours, it starts to flow into the strait in a south-westerly direction from Beaumaris. By the time, the tidal flow from the Caernarfon end is weakening and the tide continues to rise in height but the direction of tidal flow is reversed. A similar sequence is seen in reverse on a falling tide. This means that slack water between the bridges tends to occur approximately one hour before high tide or low tide.

Elsewhere in the strait the minimum depth is never less than  until the great sand flats at Lavan Sands are reached beyond Bangor.

The tides carry large quantities of fish, and the construction of fish weirs on both banks and on several of the islands, helped make the Strait an important source of fish for many centuries. Eight of the numerous Menai Strait fish weirs are now scheduled monuments.

Ecology

Marine
Because the strait has such unusual tidal conditions, coupled with very low wave heights because of its sheltered position, it presents a unique and diverse benthic ecology.

The depth of the channel reaches  in places, and the current can exceed .  It is very rich in sponges.

The existence of this unique ecology was a major factor in the establishment of Bangor University's School of Ocean Sciences at Menai Bridge, as well as its status as a special area of conservation with marine components.  The waters are also a proposed Marine Nature Reserve.

Land
The same  unique ecology and geomorphology has let to a number of designations of SSSIs along the strait including Glannau Porthaethwy, the ivy–oak–ash woodland on the southern shore (Coedydd Afon Menai) and Lavan Sands (Welsh: Traeth Lafan). The banks of the Menai Straits are home to the critically endangered Menai Whitebeam. The plant is an extremely rare species of Sorbus only found in this part of North Wales. The population contains about 30 plants, and most of these are thought to be mature.

Much of the land on Anglesey at the eastern end of the strait is designated as an area of outstanding natural beauty.

Crossings

Menai Bridge

Opened in 1826, the Menai Bridge is a 417 metre long, 30 metre tall suspension bridge, and the first bridge to cross the Menai Strait. The bridge, designed by Thomas Telford, carries the A5, a road which connects the capital London to Holyhead on Holy Island. The bridge itself is grade one listed and a candidate to become a UNESCO World Heritage Site.

Britannia Bridge

Opened in 1850, the Britannia Bridge was built as a rail bridge connecting Anglesey to the mainland. The bridge, 461 metres long and 40 metres tall, carries the North Wales Coast Line connecting Holyhead to Crewe. Between 1970 and 1972, the bridge underwent a redesign in order to accommodate what would later become the A55, a dual carriageway connecting Chester to Holyhead. The bridge is grade two listed and is the more common crossing point out of the two bridges.

From 2007 to 2023, a Third Menai Crossing had been proposed by government to tackle congestion on the other two crossings.

See also

External links 

Menai Heritage a community project celebrating the two bridges along the Menai Strait
Live webcam of the Menai Strait Broken

References

Notes

Bibliography

 
Bodies of water of the Irish Sea
Straits of Anglesey
Straits of Gwynedd